America Live is the first official live album by American folk rock duo America, released by Warner Bros. Records in October 1977. The album was recorded in July 1977 at the Greek Theater in Los Angeles, California. It was the first to feature America as a duo, as Dan Peek had left the group for a solo career two months prior to the recording of this album. The album was produced by longtime Beatles producer George Martin, the sixth of seven consecutive albums he produced with America.

Commercially, the album performed poorly compared with America's other albums; it reached number 127 on the Billboard 200. No singles were released from this album.

Track listing

References

1977 live albums
America (band) albums
Albums produced by George Martin
Warner Records live albums
Albums recorded at the Greek Theatre (Los Angeles)